"Come Give Your Love to Me" is the second single from Janet Jackson's self-titled debut album Janet Jackson (1982). The song was written by Glen Barbee and Charmaine Sylvers.

It peaked at number fifty-eight on the U.S. pop chart, seventeen on the R&B chart, and thirty on the dance chart. Following Janet's breakthrough in 1986 with the album Control, the song was included as a b-side on the 1986 single "When I Think of You".

Billboard called it "a lean rock number in the electronic new-music style, sparsely arranged."

Official versions
 Album Version - 5:03
 Seven Inch Version° - 3:57

°Unavailable on CD

Charts

Live performances
Other than a few television appearances at the time of its release. To date, Jackson has never performed the song on any of her tours.

References 

1983 singles
Janet Jackson songs
1982 songs
A&M Records singles